Abby Major is an American politician serving as a member of the Pennsylvania House of Representatives from the 60th district. She was elected in a March 2021 special election and assumed office on June 7, 2021.

Early life and education 
A native of Ford City, Pennsylvania, Major graduated from Ford City High School. She then joined the United States Army, serving as an intelligence analyst from 2004 to 2007. After leaving the Army, she attended the Pittsburgh Institute of Mortuary Science and earned a Bachelor of Science degree in mortuary science from Southern Illinois University Carbondale.

Career 
Major previously worked as the funeral director of the Curran-Shaffer Funeral Home. She later joined the staff of State Rep. Jeff Pyle, serving as a legislative assistant and later as his chief of staff. Major was elected to the Pennsylvania House of Representatives in a May 2021 special election to succeed Pyle. She assumed office on June 7, 2021.

References 

Living people
Year of birth missing (living people)
People from Armstrong County, Pennsylvania
People from Ford City, Pennsylvania
Southern Illinois University Carbondale alumni
Republican Party members of the Pennsylvania House of Representatives
Women state legislators in Pennsylvania
21st-century American women politicians
21st-century American politicians